Alain Elvis Bono Mack Mboune (born 19 December 1983) is a retired Cameroonian football player who played primarily as a midfielder.

Club career
Bono has previously played for Ternana Calcio in the Italian Serie B, for Widzew Łódź in the Polish Ekstraklasa, and for Kazakhstan Premier League champions FC Aktobe.

References

External links
 

Living people
1983 births
Footballers from Douala
Cameroonian footballers
Serie B players
Ekstraklasa players
Championnat National players
Veikkausliiga players
Kazakhstan Premier League players
U.S. Alessandria Calcio 1912 players
A.S.D. Paternò 1908 players
Ternana Calcio players
S.S. Teramo Calcio players
Widzew Łódź players
Paris FC players
FC Aktobe players
Kuopion Palloseura players
Cameroonian expatriate footballers
Expatriate footballers in Italy
Cameroonian expatriate sportspeople in Italy
Expatriate footballers in France
Cameroonian expatriate sportspeople in France
Expatriate footballers in Poland
Cameroonian expatriate sportspeople in Poland
Expatriate footballers in Kazakhstan
Cameroonian expatriate sportspeople in Kazakhstan
Expatriate footballers in Finland
Cameroonian expatriate sportspeople in Finland
Association football midfielders